The American Society of Plastic Surgeons (ASPS) is the largest plastic surgery specialty organization in the world. Founded in 1931, the society is composed of surgeons certified by the American Board of Plastic Surgery or by the Royal College of Physicians and Surgeons of Canada who perform Plastic and Reconstructive surgery. ASPS comprises 93% of all board-certified plastic surgeons in the United States and has more than 8,000 plastic surgeons worldwide. ASPS publishes the plastic surgery journal, Plastic and Reconstructive Surgery.

Research
ASPS runs The Plastic Surgery Foundation (The PSF), which supports research by ASPS members through grants, awards and scholarships. The foundation also funds educational research programs.

References

External links
 

Plastic surgery organizations
Surgical organizations based in the United States
Medical and health professional associations in Chicago
1931 establishments in the United States